The 2018 South American Under-23 Championships in Athletics was the eighth edition of the biennial track and field competition for South American athletes aged under 23 years old, organised by CONSUDATLE.

Medal summary

Men

Women

Medal table

Participation

References

Medal table
. CONSUDATLE. Retrieved on 2019-05-29.

External links

2018
South American Under-23 Championships in Athletics
South American Under-23 Championships in Athletics
South American Under-23 Championships in Athletics
International athletics competitions hosted by Ecuador
South American Under-23 Championships in Athletics